The striped croaker is a U.S. National Marine Fisheries Service Species of Concern.  Species of Concern are those species about which the U.S. Government's National Oceanic and Atmospheric Administration, National Marine Fisheries Service, has some concerns regarding status and threats, but for which insufficient information is available to indicate a need to list the species under the U.S. Endangered Species Act (ESA).

Description
The striped croaker is characterized as an oblong small fish, gray or grayish blue in color dorsally and silvery below.  This is a tropical species whose range is centered in the Caribbean Sea.

Ecology
This is a tropical species whose range is centered in the Caribbean Sea. The rock-reef habitats that this species occurs in typically support luxuriant growths of attached algae.  Major prey items include benthic crustaceans (shrimp) inhabiting soft sediments.

Conservation
The specific habitat occupied by the species is vulnerable to beachfront habitat alteration activities including beach renourishment projects and dredge-and-fill operations, both of which increase sedimentation and water turbidity and cover necessary habitat.

Conservation designations
IUCN : Not Evaluated

American Fisheries Society: Vulnerable

References
NMFS. Species of Concern Fact Sheet . 2008

Sciaenidae
Fish described in 1890
Taxa named by David Starr Jordan